The 2014–15 South West Peninsula League season was the eighth in the history of the South West Peninsula League, a football competition in England, that feeds the Premier Division of the Western Football League. The league had been formed in 2007 from the merger of the Devon County League and the South Western League, and is restricted to clubs based in Cornwall and Devon. The Premier Division of the South West Peninsula League is on the same level of the National League System as the Western League Division One.

Premier Division

The Premier Division featured 20 teams, the same as the previous season, after Tavistock were relegated to Division One East, and Liskeard Athletic were relegated to Division One West. Two new clubs joined the league:

Callington Town, promoted as champions of Division One West.
Stoke Gabriel, promoted as champions of Division One East.

Only AFC St Austell and Exmouth Town applied to join the Western League Premier Division, with a top three finish also required for promotion. However, Exmouth failed to finish in the top three and St Austell failed the ground grading inspection.

League table

Division One East
Division One East featured 18 clubs, increased from 16 the previous season, after Stoke Gabriel were promoted to the Premier Division, and three new clubs joined:

Brixham, promoted as runners-up in the South Devon League.
St Martins, promoted as champions of the Devon and Exeter League.
Tavistock, relegated from the Premier Division.

Two clubs, Tavistock and Teignmouth, applied for promotion to the Premier Division. Tavistock passed the ground grading, but Teignmouth failed. A top-five finish is also required.

Division One West
Division One West originally featured 18 clubs, increased from 16 the previous season, after Callington Town were promoted to the Premier Division, and three new clubs joined:

Illogan RBL, promoted as champions of the Cornwall Combination.
Liskeard Athletic, relegated from the Premier Division.
Millbrook, promoted as third-placed club in the East Cornwall League.

On 7 July 2014, Truro City Reserves resigned from the league with immediate effect, and Foxhole Stars resigned on 22 July, leaving 16 clubs in the division.

Four clubs – Helston Athletic, Liskeard Athletic, St Dennis and Sticker – applied for promotion to the Premier Division. Helston and Liskeard passed the ground grading, but St Dennis and Sticker failed. A top-five finish is also required.

References

External links
 South West Peninsula League

South West Peninsula League
10